Richard Rankin Fellers (born October 3, 1959) is an American Olympic equestrian and horse trainer. In 2021, the United States Center for SafeSport ruled Fellers ineligible to participate in the sport, due to charges brought against him.

Early life and education
Fellers, the son of Richard D. and Colleen M. (Smith) Fellers, was born in Coos Bay, Oregon. He graduated from Yamhill-Carlton High School in 1978, and attended Oregon State University as an engineering major. He left the university in his junior year to start a riding business, and moved to California, where he met  Michelle "Shelley" Bramble. In 1987 they returned to Oregon, wed, and started a family. They have a son and a daughter.

Career 
According to the U. S. Equestrian Foundation (USEF), when Fellers was eleven years old his birthday present was a two-year-old Appaloosa: "The short, stocky horse had a talent for jumping, and the pair eventually became winners from the West Coast U. S. Grand Prix circuit to Spruce Meadows in Canada."

By 1988, Fellers had won the Arthritis Foundation Grand Prix at the Oaks in San Juan Capistrano three years in a row— twice riding the veteran mount Bailey's Irish Cream, and then on El Mirasol, his own 6-year-old chestnut thoroughbred.

In 1998, the Calgary Herald reported on his wins at the North American show jumping championships: "In the long history of Spruce Meadows, no one could quite recall a week like Fellers had. Of the nine featured classes over five days of competition, Fellers finished either first or second in every single event."

Fellers began riding Flexible, an Irish Sport Horse stallion, in 2002. According to the USEF Network,

Fellers at age 52 and 16-year-old Flexible were the oldest pair in the show jumping finals at the World Cup finals in the Netherlands. Flexible was retired in 2017, and he died of natural causes in 2021.

A resident of Sherwood, Oregon, Fellers and his wife Shelley operated Rich Fellers Stables in Oregon City, Oregon starting in  2011. Fellers trained horses there, offering jumping lessons as well as purchasing and selling horses. Harry and Molly Chapman, the owners of Flexible, hired Fellers in 2012 to train their horses and ride their best in competition.

In 2021, the United States Center for SafeSport ruled Fellers ineligible to participate in the sport, in connection with a criminal indictment. Fellers has denied  allegations that he sexually abused a minor, and his trial is set for Fall 2022.

Selected competitions 

 Equestrian at the 1991 Pan American Games
 2008 CSIO Spruce Meadows 'Masters' Tournament
 2008 CSIO Spruce Meadows 'Masters' Tournament – CN International
 2008 FEI World Cup Jumping Final
 2008, 2012 Show Jumping World Cup
 FEI World Cup Jumping 2009/2010
 2010 Dublin Horse Show
 2010 Falsterbo Horse Show
 FEI World Cup Jumping 2010/2011
 2010 FEI World Cup Jumping Final
 2010 Royal International Horse Show
 2011 CSIO Schweiz
 2011 FEI Nations Cup Promotional League
 2011 FEI World Cup Finals
 2011 Jumping International de France
 2011 Piazza di Siena
 FEI World Cup Jumping 2011/2012
 2012 FEI World Cup Finals (show jumping and dressage)
 Equestrian at the 2012 Summer Olympics – Individual jumping
 Equestrian at the 2012 Summer Olympics – Team jumping

 2015 FEI World Cup Finals (show jumping and dressage)

Awards and honors 
 Competed in nine annual championships. 
 On the Bronze winning U.S. team at the 1991 Pan American Games in Havana, Cuba.
 2006 West Coast League winner.
 Competed in two events at the 2012 Summer Olympics.
 2012 United States Equestrian Federation Equestrian of the Year award.
 Inducted into the Oregon Sports Hall of Fame in 2012.

See also 

 Show jumping
 World Show Jumping Championships

References

External links

  (vide, 2:53 minutes)
 A Conversation with Richard Fellars, by Paula Parisi
 

1959 births
Living people
American male equestrians
Olympic equestrians of the United States
Equestrians at the 2012 Summer Olympics
Pan American Games medalists in equestrian
Pan American Games bronze medalists for the United States
Equestrians at the 1991 Pan American Games
People from Coos Bay, Oregon
People from Sherwood, Oregon
Sportspeople from Oregon
Sportspeople from Oregon City, Oregon
Medalists at the 1991 Pan American Games